Princess: A Private Novel, written by James Patterson and Rees Jones, is the thirteenth book of the Private Series. Private is a private investigative agency started by Jack Morgan's father and subsequently built into a worldwide enterprise by Jack Morgan.

Plot
This book is a thriller novel set in England and Wales. The main characters are Morgan and Peter Knight, the director of Private London, a subsidiary of Private. Private and Private London have been commissioned by Princess Caroline, third in line to the British throne, to locate Sophie Edwards. Sophie, a close friend of the Princess, has disappeared. While Morgan and his people are working this case, a nemesis from the past surfaces and inflicts a painful blow to Morgan. He is determined to find his old enemy before more people are hurt.

References

 Novels by James Patterson
 2018 American novels
American thriller novels
Collaborative novels
Grand Central Publishing books
Books about princesses
Novels set in England
Novels set in Wales
Novels about missing people